The Thermidorians (named after the month of Thermidor), known also a Thermidorian Convention ( was a French political group active during the French Revolution between 1794 and 1799.

History 
The group was named for the Thermidorian Reaction in 1794, when its members—led by Paul Barras, Jean-Lambert Tallien and Joseph Fouché—formed a coup d'état against Maximilien Robespierre and Louis Antoine de Saint-Just, who were executed with their supporters on 27 July 1794. The deputies that supported the Reaction were the following:
 Moderates (members of The Marsh) like Emmanuel Joseph Sieyès, Jean de Cambacérès and Boissy d'Anglas
 Montagnards opposite to Robespierre like Tallien and Jean-Baptiste Carrier
 Members of the Committee of Public Safety like Barras, Bertrand Barère, Lazare Carnot, Marc Vadier, Jean Amar and Collot d'Herbois

Over the following days, the Thermidorians took over the majority in the National Convention and in 1795 a new constitution was created, with the National Convention disestablished for the creation of the French Directory. The Thermidorians became a republican and bourgeoisie group—and like the new constitution—also conservative on social themes and liberal on economic themes.

After the election of 1795, the Thermidorians obtained the majority in the Council of Five Hundred, the new lower house. In Paris, the group created a headquarters in the Hôtel de Noailles and Paul Barras became its leader, but also the ruler of the France until 1799, when the coup of 18 Brumaire by Napoleon Bonaparte removed the Barras' Directory to be replaced with a Consulate with himself as First Consul.

After the coup, the various parliamentary forces including the Thermidorians were disestablished.

Electoral results

References

 
1794 establishments in France
1799 disestablishments in France
Political parties established in 1794
Political parties disestablished in 1799
Groups of the French Revolution
Classical liberal parties
Conservative liberal parties
Centrist parties in France
Republicanism in France